The 1999–2000 Algerian Championnat National was the 38th season of the Algerian Championnat National since its establishment in 1962. A total of 12 teams contested the league, with MC Alger as the defending champions, The Championnat started on 14 October, 1999. and ended on 15 June, 2000.

Team summaries

Promotion and relegation 
Teams promoted from Algerian Division 2 1999–2000 
 ASM Oran
 AS Aïn M'lila
 USM El Harrach
 CS Constantine

Teams relegated to Algerian Division 2 2000–2001
 No relegated

League table

Result table

Season statistics

Top scorers

References

External links
1999–2000 Algerian Championnat National

Algerian Championnat National
Championnat National
Algerian Ligue Professionnelle 1 seasons